Ahiya (also transliterated as Achiya or Achia) is an Israeli outpost in the West Bank, about 1.5 km southeast of the Palestinian village of Jalud.  It falls under the purview of the Mateh Binyamin Regional Council. Israeli outposts are considered illegal both under international law as well as under Israeli law.

It is named after the Biblical prophet Ahijah the Shilonite who lived in Shiloh, which is about 3 km to its west.

Demographics
As of 2004 permanent construction of homes in Ahiya was being carried out.
As of 2011 the population of Ahiya was about 50 people.

Geography
Ahiya is near the Israeli outpost of Shvut Rachel as well as the Palestinian village of Jalud. 

According to ARIJ, Israel confiscated land from the Palestinian villages of Jalud and Qusra in order to construct the Israeli outposts of Ahiya and Esh Kodesh.

Economy
Ahiya has the only Jewish owned oil press in the region. Settlers from the region bring their olives to Ahiya to be pressed.

Attacks against Palestinians
Palestinian farmers from nearby Jalud have accused settlers from Ahiya of taking harvested olives from them by force.

On 9 February 2011, Israeli settlers from Ahiya attacked Jalud, demanding residents evacuate their houses and physically attacking local residents.

In 2022, Haaretz reported that residents of Ahiya attacked the nearby Palestinian village of Jalud with firebombs, torching cars and house yards, in what the Israeli newspaper called a "pogrom", "flaunt evil" and "settler terror".

References

Mateh Binyamin Regional Council
Israeli settlements in the West Bank
Populated places established in 1997
Israeli outposts
Unauthorized Israeli settlements